The Swingers were a New Zealand rock band who were together from 1979 to 1982 and whose biggest single was the song "Counting the Beat".

Background
Formed out of the remnants of the Suburban Reptiles, the founding members were Phil Judd (guitar, vocals), Wayne Stevens ( Bones Hillman) (bass), and Mark Hough (a.k.a. Buster Stiggs) (drums). Formed in 1979, the band released the single "One Good Reason", which was a top 20 hit in New Zealand. They also appeared on the Ripper Records sampler AK79 and established a large live following after a residency at Auckland's Liberty Stage club.

In 1980 the band moved to Australia and signed to Mushroom Records for that country, although their New Zealand releases remained on Ripper.

Success
After some band dissension, Ian Gilroy of the Crocodiles replaced Hough on drums. The band released the single "Counting the Beat", which became a No. 1 hit in Australia and New Zealand. A second single released in 1981, "It Ain't What You Dance, It's the Way That You Dance It" (which had the outro repeat line "oh yeah, oh yeah, oh yeah yeah yeah yeah yeah"), was also a Top 5 hit in New Zealand but only a minor hit in Australia (reaching #43). An album, Practical Jokers, produced by David Tickle, was released. The band also performed songs in the film Starstruck.

Breakup
The band underwent a couple more line-up changes, including the addition of Pop Mechanix and Coconut Rough vocalist Andrew Snoid, before it split up in March 1982. Phil Judd went on to pursue a solo career.

Discography

Albums

Singles

References

External links
 Frenz.com Swingers biography
 Swingers discography at Australian Rock Database by Magnus Holmgren
 

 Swingers, Rip It Up, 1 February 1980, p6

1979 establishments in New Zealand
1982 disestablishments in New Zealand
APRA Award winners
New Zealand new wave musical groups
Musical groups established in 1979
Musical groups disestablished in 1982
New Zealand musical trios
Musical groups from Auckland
New Zealand expatriates in Australia